Alexander James Hall (4 January 1869 – 8 March 1953) was an Australian rules footballer who played for the Essendon Football Club in the Victorian Football Association (VFA) in 1891 to 1896 then in the Victorian Football League (VFL) from 1898 to 1900. In 1906, his first year of coaching in the VFL, he played his only game for the St Kilda Football Club (under the assumed name of "Wyberg"). He went on to coach Melbourne (twice), Richmond and was Hawthorn's coach in their inaugural season in the VFL.

References 

 Hogan P: The Tigers Of Old, Richmond FC, Melbourne 1996

External links

 
 Alec Hall's coaching statistics from AFL Tables
 Essendon Football Club profile

St Kilda Football Club coaches
Essendon Football Club players
St Kilda Football Club players
Essendon Association Football Club players
Melbourne Football Club coaches
Richmond Football Club coaches
Hawthorn Football Club coaches
Williamstown Football Club coaches
Preston Football Club (VFA) players
Australian rules footballers from Victoria (Australia)
1869 births
1953 deaths
Essendon Football Club (VFA) players